Matthew J. Zunic (September 19, 1919 – December 15, 2006) was an American professional basketball player and coach. He played college basketball at the George Washington University. A 6'3" guard, he played one season in the Basketball Association of America (BAA), a precursor to the NBA. He averaged 4.9 points per game for the Washington Capitols.

He later coached at Boston University and the University of Massachusetts. He coached seven season at BU (1952–53 through 1958–59), compiling a 96-58 record (.623). He then moved to the University of Massachusetts, coaching for four seasons (1959–60 through 1962–63), compiling a 57-41 record (.582). In the 1961–62 season, Massachusetts won their first Yankee Conference title, and played in the school's first NCAA tournament.

BAA career statistics

Regular season

Playoffs

Head coaching record

References

External links

1919 births
2006 deaths
American men's basketball coaches
American men's basketball players
American people of Croatian descent
Basketball coaches from Florida
Basketball players from Florida
Boston University Terriers men's basketball coaches
Eastern Basketball Association coaches
Flint Dow A.C.'s coaches
Flint Dow A.C.'s players
Forwards (basketball)
George Washington Colonials men's basketball coaches
George Washington Colonials men's basketball players
Guards (basketball)
Player-coaches
UMass Minutemen basketball coaches
Washington Capitols draft picks
Washington Capitols players
Westfield State Owls men's basketball coaches